Records and statistics for Lechia Gdańsk.

Records and statistics

All-time 

First Ever Game: 
 (Friendly) 2 September 1945, Milicyjnym Klubem Sportowym z Wrzeszcza, 4-6
 (Competitive) 9 September 1945, Wojskowy Klub Sportowy, 9-1
First Ever Win: 9 September 1945, Wojskowy Klub Sportowy, 9-1
Biggest Win: 15–0 vs LKS Waplewo, 11 May 2001
Biggest Defeat: 8–0 vs Polonia Bytom, 13 November 1949
Highest Scoring Game: - 15 goals
 11–4 vs SKS Płomień Gdańsk, 9 December 1945
 15–0 vs LKS Waplewo, 11 May 2002
Most Goals by a player in a Game: 7 goals – Stanisław Baran vs Wojskowy Klub Sportowy, 20 September 1945
Fasted Goal Scored in a Game: 16 seconds – Paweł Buzała vs Wisła Kraków, 23 May 2009
 Most Total Goals in a Season: Bartłomiej Stolc, 2001–02 season – 40 goals
 Most League Goals in a Season: Bartłomiej Stolc, 2002–03 season – 34 goals
Most League Goals in a Season: (top three divisions) Jerzy Kruszczyński, 1983–84 season – 31 goals
Most League Goals for Lechia Gdańsk: Flávio Paixão – 83 goals 
Most Goals in all Competitions for Lechia Gdańsk: Roman Rogocz – 109 goals 
Most League Apps for Lechia Gdańsk: Roman Korynt – 327 apps 
Most Apps in all competitions for Lechia Gdańsk: Roman Korynt - 341 apps 
Youngest player to feature for the first team: Kacper Urbański (achieved 21 December 2019) - 15 years, 3 months and 4 days vs Raków Częstochowa
Oldest player to feature for the first team: Zdzisław Puszkarz (achieved 11 June 1988) - 38 years, 3 months and 24 days vs GKS Katowice
Youngest Goal-scorer for the first team: Sławomir Wojciechowski (achieved 16 September 1989) - 16 years, 0 months and 10 days vs Polonia Bytom
Oldest Goal-scorer for the first team: Flávio Paixão (achieved 24 October 2022) - 38 years, 1 months and 6 days vs Zagłębie Lubin
Highest percentage of goals per game: Marian Łącz - 250% (10 games, 25 goals)
Highest percentage of goals per game, having scored more than 10 goals: Marian Łącz - 250% (10 games, 25 goals)
Highest percentage of goals per game, having played more than 10 games: Bartłomiej Stolc - 106.5% (76 games, 81 goals)
Highest Transfer Fee Paid: Daniel Łukasik, 2014 - 2,750,000zł (€800,000) 
Highest Transfer Fee Received: Vanja Milinković-Savić, 2017 - 10,500,000zł (€2.6 million)

Notes

Ekstraklasa 

Debut Match in Ekstraklasa: March 20, 1949, Cracovia 5–1 Lechia Gdańsk 
First Win in Ekstraklasa: March 27, 1949, Lechia Gdańsk 5–3 Ruch Chorzów 
Biggest Win in Ekstraklasa: 5–0 vs four teams; Cracovia – 7 September 1952, Zagłębie Sosnowiec – 28 April 1957, Arkonia Szczecin – 25 March 1962, Podbeskidzie – 13 February 2015
Biggest Defeat in Ekstraklasa: 8–0 vs Polonia Bytom, 13 November 1949
Most Lechia Goals in the Ekstraklasa: Flávio Paixão - 84 goals
Most Lechia Apps in the Ekstraklasa: Flávio Paixão - 222 apps
Youngest player to feature for the first team (Ekstraklasa): Kacper Urbański (achieved 21 December 2019) - 15 years, 3 months and 4 days vs Raków Częstochowa
Oldest player to feature for the first team (Ekstraklasa): Zdzisław Puszkarz (achieved 11 June 1988) - 38 years, 3 months and 24 days vs GKS Katowice
Youngest Goal-scorer for the first team (Ekstraklasa): Kacper Łazaj (achieved 9 November 2012) - 17 years, 3 months and 16 days vs Ruch Chorzów
Oldest Goal-scorer for the first team (Ekstraklasa): Flávio Paixão (achieved 24 October 2022) - 38 years, 1 months and 6 days vs Zagłębie Lubin
Highest percentage of goals per game (Ekstraklasa): Bronisław Szlagowski - 54.5% (11 games, 6 goals)
Highest percentage of goals per game, having scored more than 10 goals (Ekstraklasa): Marco Paixão - 51.5% (66 games, 34 goals)

Ekstraklasa goal milestones

The milestone goals scored by Lechia players in the Ekstraklasa.

1st goal: Piotr Nierychło (Cracovia 5–1 Lechia; 20 March 1949)
100th goal: Roman Rogocz (Lechia 2–1 Stal Sosnowiec; 2 September 1956)
200th goal: Czesław Nowicki (Lechia 2–2 Wisła Kraków; 18 September 1960)
300th goal: Mirosław Pękala (Lechia 4–4 Śląsk Wrocław; 17 August 1985)
400th goal: Emmanuel Tetteh (ŁKS Łódź 2–3 Lechia;5 June 1996)
500th goal: Abdou Razack Traore (Lechia 2–1 Lech Poznań; 22 May 2011)
600th goal: Maciej Makuszewski (Lechia 3–1 Piast Gliwice; 29 March 2014)
700th goal: Sebastian Mila (Lechia 2–0 Ruch Chorzów; 9 April 2016)
800th goal: Adam Chrzanowski (Lechia 2–2 Bruk-Bet Termalica Nieciecza; 27 February 2018)
900th goal: Flávio Paixão (Lechia 4–3 Arka Gdynia; 31 May 2020)
1000th goal: Flávio Paixão (Lechia 2–0 Warta Poznań; 23 April 2022)

Stadium statistics 

Last Game at the MOSiR Stadium Gdańsk: May 29, 2011, Zagłębie Lubin, 1-2
Last Win at the MOSiR Stadium Gdańsk: May 22, 2011, Lech Poznań, 2-1
Last Lechia Goalscorer at the MOSiR Stadium Gdańsk: May 29, 2011, Abdou Razack Traoré  
First Game at the Stadion Energa Gdańsk: August 14, 2011, Cracovia, 1-1 
First Win at the Stadion Energa Gdańsk: September 12, 2011, Górnik Zabrze, 2-1
First Lechia Goalscorer at the Stadion Energa Gdańsk: August 14, 2011, Fred Benson
Highest all time Attendance: September 29, 1983, Juventus, UEFA Cup Winners Cup - 40,000 (estimate)
Highest Ekstraklasa attendance at the Stadion Energa Gdańsk: March 19, 2017, Legia Warsaw - 37,220
Lowest Ekstraklasa attendance at the Stadion Energa Gdańsk: February 27, 2018, Nieciecza - 2,235

League attendances 

†Season in progress.

All of the released attendance figures for Lechia Gdańsk before the 2011–12 Ekstraklasa season were rounded to the nearest 500.
The impact of the coronavirus outbreak should be noted for the 2019–20 and 2020–21 seasons and its impact on attendance figures. The final two games of the regular season had to be played behind closed doors, in games which would usually draw a large attendance (the Tricity derby game against Arka Gdynia was the highest home attendance the two seasons prior). The final three games of the season, each in the championship round, had crowd restrictions due to the easing of lock-down. This has massively impacted the average attendance figures. While in the 2020–21 season fans were only able to attend 3 of the 15 home league games.

Notes

Goalscorers

Top goalscorers by season

†Season still in progress

The Polish Cup has always been held in two calendar years (e.g. September to May) where as in Lechia's history the league was held in one calendar year from 1949 to 1962. For the 1950–62 seasons when Lechia played in the cup, the goals will count towards the season of the final, example: the 1956-57 Polish Cup goals will be added to the 1957 league season. 
The Cup goals includes goals from the Polish Cup, Polish SuperCup, and any goals scored in European competitions.
The Polish Cup was not held from 1926 to 1950, 1953, and from 1958 to 1961.

Notes

Player statistics

All time player statistics
(Stats correct as of 11 March 2023)

All-time most Lechia appearances and goals.

Ekstraklasa player statistics

The players listed have either; a minimum of 100 league appearances or 10 league goals for Lechia in the Ekstraklasa.

(Stats correct as of 11 March 2023)

League player statistics

The players listed are in the top 25 for appearances or goals in the league (the league stats counted include all league competitions from the Ekstraklasa (first tier) down to the A Klasa (sixth tier)).

(Stats correct as of 11 March 2023)

Polish Cup player statistics

The players listed have either; a minimum of 15 cup appearances or 5 cup goals for Lechia in the Polish Cup.

(Stats correct as of 9 November 2022)

Polish Cup finals

The players listed have scored for Lechia in a Polish Cup final.

(Stats correct as of 31 July 2020)

Polish SuperCup

The players listed have scored for Lechia in a Polish SuperCup final.

(Stats correct as of 30 July 2020)

European competitions

The players listed have scored for Lechia in any European competition (UEFA Cup Winners' Cup 1983, Europa League 2019, Europa Conference League 2022).

(Stats correct as of 1 August 2022)

Polish League Cup player statistics

The League Cup in Poland has been played over various different competitions. The League Cups Lechia took part in were the Young Leaders Rally Cup (1952), Polish League Cup (2000–01), and the Ekstraklasa Cup (2008–2009). Due to there being no League Cup in Poland for the foreseeable future, those that made 10 or more appearances are included as well as those who scored more than one goal for Lechia in a League Cup competition.

(Stats correct as of 31 August 2020)

Cards

All-time most yellow and red cards.

Yellow and red cards were introduced in the 1971–72 season. Before this season players would be excluded from further play in the game, as a result of no cards being used before this season, any players excluded from further play in the game are not included.

(Stats correct as of 5 February 2023)

Hat-tricks

Ekstraklasa hat-tricks

Hat-trick's scored by Lechia players in the Ekstraklasa.

Hat-tricks scored for Lechia

Hat-tricks scored by Lechia players in any competitive competition.

Age statistics

Goal scorers

Players are only listed once, this will either be at the date of their first goal for the youngest goal scorers, or for their last goal with the oldest goal scorers.

Transfers 

The top 10 record arrivals and departures for Lechia.

Awards 
The awards shown are those handed out by the Ekstraklasa, and only includes awards given to Lechia players since the club's promotion to the top division back in 2008. In the case of top goal scorers however, it lists every player who is known to have scored the most in the competition for that season.

Seasonal

League Top Goalscorer; 
1983–84 (II liga) – Jerzy Kruszczyński (31 goals)
2001–02 (Class A (Gdańsk IV)) – Bartłomiej Stolc (29 goals)
2016–17 (Ekstraklasa) – Marco Paixão (18 goals)

Polish Cup Top Goalscorer;
2007–08 – Paweł Buzała (6 goals)
2019–20 – Flávio Paixão (5 goals)

League Top Assister;
2018–19 – Filip Mladenovic (9 assists)

Ekstraklasa Goalkeeper of the Season; 
2019–20 – Dušan Kuciak

Ekstraklasa Number of the Season
(An award that recognises the most significant milestone achieved that season)

2021–22 – Flávio Paixão (100); Flávio became the first foreigner to score 100 goals in the Ekstraklasa.

Turbokozak winner
(Turbokozak is a tv programme where players compete in footballing skill games to achieve the highest score)

2017–18 – Sebastian Mila (245pts)
2021–22 – Łukasz Zwoliński (310pts)

Monthly
Player of the month;
October 2012 – Abdou Razack Traoré
November 2018 – Flávio Paixão
February 2019 – Filip Mladenović
June 2020 – Łukasz Zwoliński

Manager of the month;
September 2021 – Tomasz Kaczmarek

Number of the Month
(An award that recognises the most significant milestone, record, or statistic achieved that month)

October 2021 – Dušan Kuciak (277); Kuciak became the foreign player to amass the most Ekstraklasa appearances with 277.
April 2022 – Flávio Paixão (100); Flávio became the first foreign player to score 100 goals in the Ekstraklasa.
August 2022 – Dušan Kuciak (300); Kuciak became the first foreign player to reach 300 Ekstraklasa appearances.

Internationals

Internationals (while at Lechia)

Players who have represented their national team while playing for Lechia.

Players in bold are still at the club

(Correct as of 26 September 2022)

International goals

International goals by players playing for Lechia

Internationals (during career) 

The following players have played for their national team but not necessarily during their time with Lechia

(Dates in brackets is the time they spent playing for Lechia)

The players below played for their respective countries at any point during their career with the dates showing their time with Lechia.

 Poland
  Arkadiusz Bąk (1995)
  Krzysztof Baszkiewicz (1950–1953)
  Jarosław Bieniuk (1995–1998), (2012–2014)
  Ariel Borysiuk (2014–2016), (2018–2019)
  Piotr Brożek (2012–2013)
  Stanisław Baran (1945)
  Adam Buksa (2014–2016)
  Stanisław Burzyński (1965–1969)
  Paweł Dawidowicz (2011–2014)
  Tomasz Dawidowski (2009–2012)
  Jan Erlich (1978–1981)
  Adam Fedoruk (1998–2001)
  Przemysław Frankowski (2012–2014)
  Zygmunt Gadecki (1960–1962)
  Jacek Grembocki (1982–1986), (1996–1997)
  Henryk Gronowski (1949–1967)
  Robert Gronowski (1949–1958)
  Tadeusz Hogendorf (1945)
  Marcin Kaczmarek (2008–2010)
  Rafał Kaczmarczyk (1989–1994)
  Jerzy Kasalik (1975–1976)
  Alfred Kokot (1946–1953)
  Roman Korynt (1953–1967)
  Jakub Kosecki (2011–2012)
  Rafał Kosznik (2006–2008), (2010)
  Juliusz Kruszankin (1996)
  Janusz Kupcewicz (1986–1988)
  Marek Ługowski (1985–1994)
  Daniel Łukasik (2014–2020)
  Maciej Makuszewski (2014–2017)
  Sebastian Małkowski (2008–2013)
  Marcin Mięciel (1990–1993)
  Sebastian Mila (2000–2001), (2015–2018)
  Jarosław Nowicki (1985–1989)
  Mariusz Pawlak (1988–1996), (2006–2007)
  Sławomir Peszko (2015–2020)
  Mirosław Pękala (1985–1988)
  Rafał Pietrzak (2020–)
  Zdzisław Puszkarz (1966–1981), (1986–1988)
  Grzegorz Rasiak (2012–2013)

  Artur Sobiech (2018–2019)
  Janusz Stawarz (1985–1990)
  Łukasz Surma (2009–2013)
  Grzegorz Szamotulski (1991–1993)
  Mirosław Tłokiński (1975–1976)
  Łukasz Trałka (2008)
  Jakub Wawrzyniak (2015–2018)
  Jakub Wilk (2012)
  Sławomir Wojciechowski (1989–1993), (2004–2007)
  Grzegorz Wojtkowiak (2015–2019)
  Rafał Wolski (2016–2020)
  Hubert Wołąkiewicz (2007–2011)
  Paweł Wszołek (2004–2005)
  Marek Zieńczuk (1996–1999), (2010)

 Afghanistan
  Omran Haydary (2020–)

 Armenia
  Levon Hayrapetyan (2011–2013)

 Bosnia and Herzegovina
  Stojan Vranješ (2014–2015)

 Bulgaria
  Simeon Slavchev (2016–2018)

 Burkina Faso
  Abdou Razack Traoré (2010–2012)

 Canada
  Steven Vitória (2016–2019)

 Congo DR
  Christopher Oualembo (2012–2014)

 Croatia
  Antonio Čolak (2014–2015)
  Mario Maloča (2015–2018) (2019–)
  Mato Miloš (2017–2018)
  Luka Vučko (2011–2012)

 Curaçao
  Gino van Kessel (2017)

 Ghana
  Joseph Aziz (1995)
  Emmanuel Tetteh (1995–1996)

 Guinea-Bissau
  Romário Baldé (2017–2019)
  Rudinilson Silva (2014–2016)

Haiti
  Joenal Castma (1999–2000)

 Indonesia
  Egy Maulana Vikri (2018–2021)
  Witan Sulaeman (2021–2022)

Israel
  Joel Abu Hanna (2022–)

 Japan
  Daisuke Matsui (2013)

 Latvia
  Oļegs Laizāns (2010)
  Ivans Lukjanovs (2009–2012)
  Kristers Tobers (2020–)

 Lithuania
  Vytautas Andriuškevičius (2010–2013)
  Donatas Kazlauskas (2015–2016)

Mali
  Bassekou Diabaté (2021–)

Martinique
  Bedi Buval (2010–2011)

 Serbia
  Danijel Aleksić (2014)
  Miloš Krasić (2015–2018)
  Vanja Milinković-Savić (2016–2017)
  Filip Mladenović (2018–2020)

 Slovakia
  Lukáš Haraslín (2015–2020)
  Dušan Kuciak (2017–)
  Jaroslav Mihalík (2019–2021)

 United States
  Jerzy Panek (1973)

 Dual nationals;
Israel & United States 
   Kenny Saief (2020–2021)

Tournament players

World Cup players

The following players have been selected by their country for the World Cup Finals, while playing for Lechia.

European Championship players

The following players have been selected by their country for the UEFA European Championship Finals, while playing for Lechia.

Africa Cup of Nations Players

The following players have been selected by their country for the Africa Cup of Nations Finals, while playing for Lechia.

CONCACAF Gold Cup Players

The following players have been selected by their country for the CONCACAF Gold Cup Finals, while playing for Lechia.

UEFA Nations League players

The following players have been selected by their country for the UEFA Nations League, while playing for Lechia.

AFF Championship players

The following players have been selected by their country for the AFF Championship, while playing for Lechia.

Managerial records and statistics

Stats correct as of 14 September 2021.

Most games as manager: Jerzy Jastrzębowski (156 games)
Most wins as manager: Jerzy Jastrzębowski - 103
Most draws as manager: Bogusław Kaczmarek - 44
Most defeats as manager: Stanisław Stachura - 66
Highest win percentage in managers Lechia career (minimum 10 games): Tadeusz Małolepszy - 78.9% (30 wins in 38 games)
Lowest win percentage in managers Lechia career (minimum 10 games): Edward Wojewódzki - 7.7% (1 wins in 13 games)
Managers who have managed at least 100 games for Lechia: Jerzy Jastrzębowski (156), Bogusław Kaczmarek (148), Piotr Stokowiec (139), Stanisław Stachura (127)

Managerial achievements

Finished in the top 3 in the Ekstraklasa: Tadeusz Foryś (3rd, 1955), Piotr Stokowiec (3rd, 2019)
Won the Polish Cup: Jerzy Jastrzębowski (1983), Piotr Stokowiec (2019)
Won the Polish SuperCup: Jerzy Jastrzębowski (1983), Piotr Stokowiec (2019)
Won promotion to the Ekstraklasa with Lechia: Czesław Bartolik (1951), Tadeusz Foryś (1954), Jerzy Jastrzębowski (1984), Dariusz Kubicki (2008)
Club statistic: Stanisław Stachura managed an independent Lechia Gdańsk as well as both of the teams created by mergers; Olimpia-Lechia Gdańsk & Lechia-Polonia Gdańsk.

Random statistics

Goal-scoring Goalkeepers: Józef Pokorski - 5 Penalties (all in 1948) vs PTC Pabianice; 5–2, Skra Częstochowa; 6–1, Gwardia Olsztyn; 7–2, Bzura Chodaków; 4–4, and Gedania Gdańsk; 5-1Krzysztof Słabik - 2 goals (both in 1974) Penalties vs Warta Poznań; 2–0, Olimpia Poznań; 1-0Ludwik Łoś - 1 goal (1946) Penalty vs Bałtyk Gdańsk; 12–0.Mateusz Bąk - 1 goal (2002) vs LKS Waplewo; 15-0 (scored the 15th goal in the 90th minute from a penalty) 
Most Different Leagues Played in for Lechia Mateusz Bąk (2000-2010, 2013–17) 6 different divisions - Klasa A group Gdańsk IV (sixth tier),  Liga okręgowa group Gdańsk II (fifth tier), IV liga group Pomorska (fourth tier), III liga group II (third tier), II liga (second tier), Ekstraklasa (first tier).
Most Promotions with Lechia: Mateusz Bąk (2000–10, 2013–17) 5 promotions - Sixth tier to first tier.
Most goals in the Tricity derby: Flávio Paixão - 10 goals
Players who have spent their whole professional playing career with Lechia: Roman Rogocz (1947–62), Marian Maksymiuk (1961–73), Czesław Nowicki (1951–66), Józef Gładysz (1970–82) & Andrzej Salach (1977–93)
Those who spent their whole playing career with Lechia but played for less than 10 years: Janusz Charczuk (1960–68) & Jerzy Jastrzębowski (1967–74)
First player born in the 21st century to feature for Lechia: Mateusz Żukowski (born 23 November 2001) vs Sandecja Nowy Sącz 16 December 2017
Family members who have played for Lechia; (only league stats shown)
 Hubert Nowakowski (1945–1952: 10 apps) & Ewald Nowakowski (1963–1965: 7 apps) – Father & Son
 Alfred Kokot (1946–1953: 82 apps, 27 goals) & Henryk Kokot (1946–1952: 48 apps, 12 goals) – Brothers
 Aleksander Kupcewicz (1946–1957: 87 apps, 30 goals), Zbigniew Kupcewicz (1971–1972: 19 apps, 4 goals) & Janusz Kupcewicz (1986–1988: 39 apps, 8 goals) – Father & Sons
 Zygmunt Adamczyk (1949: 1 app) & Roman Adamczyk (1949–1950: 2 apps) – Brothers
 Robert Gronowski (1949–1960: 161 apps, 58 goals), Henryk Gronowski (1949–1961, 1963–1969: 258 apps) & Jakub Gronowski (2003–2005: 28 apps, 1 goal) – Brothers (Robert & Henryk) & Grandfather & Grandson (Robert & Jakub)
 Roman Korynt (1953–1968: 327 apps, 8 goals) & Tomasz Korynt (1972–1977: 102 apps, 33 goals) – Father & Son
 Alfred Kobylański (1955–1957: 38 apps, 7 goals) & Martin Kobylański (2016–2017: 3 apps) – Grandfather & Grandson
 Kazimierz Frąckiewicz (1956–1959, 1961–1964: 88 apps, 13 goals) & Janusz Frąckiewicz (1962: 1 app, 0 goals) – Twins
 Ryszard Kaczmarek (1963, 1967: 6 apps, 0 goals) & Andrzej Kaczmarek (1969–1974: 98 apps, 5 goals) – Brothers
 Jerzy Gorski (1969–1979: 191 apps, 2 goals) & Grzegorz Górski (1991, 1993–1995: 21 apps, 0 goals) – Father & Son
 Wojciech Łazarek (1967–1970: 35 apps, 16 goals) & Grzegorz Łazarek (1985–1988: 48 apps, 1 goal) – Father & Son
 Mirosław Głos (1975–1977: 18 apps) & Dariusz Głos (1993–1997: 57 apps, 8 goals) – Father & Son
 Bogusław Kaczmarek (1975–1977: 54 apps, 7 goals) & Marcin Kaczmarek (1990–1994, 2003–2004: 93 apps, 22 goals) – Father & Son
 Andrzej Wydrowski (1981–1985: 28 apps) & Janusz Wydrowski (1981–1984: 7 apps) – Twins
 Janusz Duda (1984: 5 apps, 0 goals) & Adam Duda (2012–2013: 26 apps, 5 goals) – Father & Son
 Grzegorz Motyka (1991–1996, 2000: 116 apps, 8 goals) & Tomasz Motyka (1991, 1993–1997: 37 apps) – Brothers
 Robert Kugiel (1998–2002: 113 apps, 23 goals) & Damian Kugiel (2011–2014: 4 apps) – Father & Son
 Michał Biskup (1999–2000: 21 apps, 0 goals) & Jakub Biskup (2004–2006: 53 apps, 7 goals) – Brothers
 Przemysław Urbański (2001–2004: 71 apps, 21 goals) & Kacper Urbański (2019–2020: 4 apps) – Father & Son
 Marco Paixão (2016–2018: 66 apps, 34 goals) & Flávio Paixão (2016–present: 161 apps, 62 goals) – Twins
Family members who have managed Lechia;
 Bogusław Kaczmarek (1989–1992, 2012–2013: 148 games) & Marcin Kaczmarek (2004–2006, 2022–present: 84 games) – Father & Son
Nations firsts
First non-Polish player: Sargis Khachatryan (Armenia) - Debut: 13 May 1993
First Asian player: Sargis Khachatryan (Armenia) - Debut: 13 May 1993
First African player: Emmanuel Tetteh (Ghana) - Debut: 5 August 1995
First South American players: Saulo Pereira de Carvalho & Sérgio Batata (both from Brazil) - Debut: 25 July 1998
First North American player: Michael Butler (United States) - Debut: 16 October 1999
First non-Polish European player: Andrey Danaev (Ukraine) - Debut: 5 May 2001

Amber Cup statistics

The Amber Cup tournament is the largest indoor football tournament in Poland and has been held most years since 2006. Lechia competed in the tournament taking a team every year from 2011 to 2018 and won the tournament four times (2011, 2013, 2016, 2017). These are the statistics for the club at this tournament.

Top goalscorer

The top goal scorers for Lechia in each tournament they participated in.

All time top scorers

Fans’ records

Lechia Gdańsk fans currently hold the following record;

Most people singing the full Polish national anthem: 7,614 - 10 November 2019, vs Pogoń Szczecin

Lechia Gdańsk fans broke the record for the most people singing all four verses of the Polish national anthem at the same time. The previous record was 3,171 people, with Lechia fans breaking the record with 7,614.

References

Records and statistics
Lechia Gdańsk